Mount Storm may refer to:

Mount Storm, West Virginia, an unincorporated community in Grant County
Mount Storm Lake, a reservoir in Grant County, West Virginia
Mount Storm Park, a City of Cincinnati municipal park
Mount Storm Power Station, on the west bank of Mount Storm Lake

See also
Mount Storm King
Storm Mountain  (disambiguation)